Somanahalli Mallaiah Krishna (born 1 May 1932) is an Indian politician who served as Minister of External Affairs of India from 2009 to October 2012. He was the 10th Chief Minister of Karnataka from 1999 to 2004 and the 19th Governor of Maharashtra from 2004 to 2008. SM Krishna had served as the Speaker of the Karnataka Vidhan Sabha from December 1989 to January 1993. He was also a member of Lok Sabha and Rajya Sabha at various times from 1971 to 2014.

Early life and education
S. M. Krishna is son of S.C. Mallaiah. He was born to a Vokkaliga family in a village named Somanahalli in the Maddur Taluk of Mandya district, Karnataka. He completed his Bachelor of Arts from Maharaja's College, Mysore and obtained a law degree from University Law College, which was then known as Government Law College in Bangalore. Krishna studied in the United States, graduating from the Southern Methodist University in Dallas, Texas and The George Washington University Law School in Washington D.C, where he was a Fulbright Scholar. Soon after his return to India, he was elected to the Karnataka Legislative Assembly in 1962.

Personal life
He is married to Prema. They have two daughters. His daughter Malavika Krishna was married to the Late V. G. Siddhartha, a businessman and the founder of Cafe Coffee Day.

At the dawn of his political life, he released his biography "Smritivahini" in the presence of many dignitaries. He has penned many interesting incidents including Veerappan Kidnapping of Rajkumar during his tenure as the chief minister. He has also quoted that the former prime minister of India and national president of Janata Dal (Secular) H. D. Devegowda had strong plans of joining Indian National Congress twice during the period of National emergency.

Political career

Krishna started his electoral political career in the year 1962 by winning Maddur Vidhana Sabha seat as an independent, defeating the prominent politician from Indian National Congress K V Shankar Gowda for whom Jawaharlal Nehru had campaigned. . Then he joined Praja Socialist Party, but lost from Maddur in 1967 to Congress' M M Gowda. He won the by-poll for Mandya (Lok Sabha constituency) in 1968 when the sitting MP died, defeating the Congress nominee.

In 1968 he was influential in reconciliation between members of the Indian National Congress and Praja Socialist Party. He served three terms as an MP from the Mandya constituency of Karnataka starting from 1968 by-poll as a socialist. His next two terms were as a Congressman, winning elections in 1971 and 1980. Mandya has remained a Congress stronghold, represented in Lok Sabha later by his political proteges like Ambareesh and Divya Spandana (also known as Ramya). S M Krishna resigned from Lok Sabha in 1972, and became MLC in Karnataka and was appointed a minister by Devaraj Urs.

After he went back to Lok Sabha in 1980, and he served as minister under Indira Gandhi between 1983–84. He lost from Mandya Lok Sabha seat in 1984, and it is unclear if he served as a minister between 1984 and 1985 under Rajiv Gandhi. Later, he became a member of the Rajya Sabha in the years 1996 and 2006. He was member of the Karnataka Legislative Assembly and council at different times. Between 1989 and 1993 he was Speaker of the Karnataka Legislative Assembly and Deputy Chief Minister of Karnataka from 1993 to 1994.

In 1999, as Karnataka Pradesh Congress Committee president, he led his party to victory in the assembly polls and took over as Chief Minister of Karnataka, a post he held until 2004. He was also instrumental in creating power reforms with ESCOMS and digitization of land records (BHOOMI) and many other citizen friendly initiatives. He encouraged private public participation and was a fore bearer of the Bangalore Advance Task Force. He later became the Governor of Maharashtra.

Krishna resigned as Governor of Maharashtra on 5 March 2008. It was reported that this was due to his intention to return to active politics in Karnataka. President Pratibha Patil accepted his resignation on 6 March.
Krishna entered the Rajya Sabha and subsequently took the oath of office as Union Cabinet Minister of External Affairs in the Council of Ministers under Prime Minister Manmohan Singh on 22 May 2009. In his tenure as the external affairs minister, he visited a number of countries including Tajikistan in 2012 to strengthen economic and energy ties.

Krishna resigned as External Affairs Minister on 26 October 2012 indicating a return to Karnataka state politics.

Krishna resigned as a member of INC on 29 January 2017 quoting that the party was in a "state of confusion" on whether it needed mass leaders or not. He also complained of having been sidelined by the party and that the party was "dependent on managers and not time-tested people like [himself]". After speculations on his joining the Bharatiya Janata Party, he formally joined the party in March 2017.

He announced his retirement from politics on 07-01-2023.

Positions held
 Member of 3rd Karnataka Legislative Assembly, 1962–67, from Maddur. But lost in 1967 on PSP ticket.
 Member, Indian Parliamentary Delegation to Commonwealth
 Parliamentary Conference, New Zealand, 1965
 Member, 4th Lok Sabha 1968–1971, Socialist MP from Mandya after a by-poll when sitting MP died in 1967. 
 Member, 5th Lok Sabha 1971–1972, Congress candidate from Mandya 
 Member, Karnataka Legislative Council 1972–1977
 Minister for Commerce & Industries & Parliamentary Affairs, Government of Karnataka 1972–77
 Member, 7th Lok Sabha 1980–1984, from Mandya. But lost 1984 Lok Sabha election.
 Member, Indian Delegation to the United Nations, 1982
 Union Minister of State for Industry during 1983–1984
 Union Minister of State for Finance during 1984–1985
 Member, 9th Karnataka Legislative Assembly 1989–1994
 Speaker, Karnataka Legislative Assembly 1989–93
 Delegate to Commonwealth Parliamentary Seminar at Westminster, UK in March 1990
 Deputy Chief Minister of Karnataka, 1993–1994
 Elected to Rajya Sabha in April 1996
 Chief Minister of Karnataka October 1999 – 2004 (MLA from Maddur)  
 Re-elected to Karnataka Legislative Assembly: 2004 (Chamrajpet constituency)
 Governor, Maharashtra: 2004–2008
 Member, Rajya Sabha from Karnataka 2008–2014
 External Affairs Minister, Government of India: 22 May 2009 to 26 October 2012.

References

External links

|-

|-

|-

|-

1932 births
Chief Ministers of Karnataka
Deputy Chief Ministers of Karnataka
George Washington University Law School alumni
Governors of Maharashtra
20th-century Indian lawyers
Kannada people
Living people
Ministers for External Affairs of India
People from Mandya district
Southern Methodist University alumni
Speakers of the Karnataka Legislative Assembly
University Law College, Bangalore University alumni
Maharaja's College, Mysore alumni
Rajya Sabha members from Karnataka
India MPs 1971–1977
India MPs 1980–1984
Lok Sabha members from Karnataka
Chief ministers from Indian National Congress
Ramakrishna Mission schools alumni
Indian National Congress politicians from Karnataka
Bharatiya Janata Party politicians from Karnataka
Mysore MLAs 1962–1967
Members of the Mysore Legislature
Karnataka MLAs 1989–1994
Karnataka MLAs 2004–2007
Independent politicians in India
Praja Socialist Party politicians
Recipients of the Padma Vibhushan in public affairs